Sara Gettelfinger (born  1977 in Louisville, Kentucky) is an American actress, singer, and dancer.

Early life and education
Gettelfinger was raised in Kentucky and Jeffersonville, Indiana. She graduated from the Youth Performing Arts School at duPont Manual High School in 1995. Gettelfinger studied at the University of Cincinnati College-Conservatory of Music where she earned a BFA in 1999.

Career
Three weeks after moving to New York City, Gettelfinger got her first professional acting role as "April" in the Helen Hayes Theatre Company's production of Stephen Sondheim's Company in Nyack, New York.

Gettelfinger performed in regional theater across the country before landing her first Broadway role as "Bird Girl" in the musical Seussical.  Her first starring role on Broadway was as "Carla" in the musical Nine with Antonio Banderas.

Gettelfinger originated the role of "Jolene Oakes" in Dirty Rotten Scoundrels, with John Lithgow, Sherie Rene Scott, Gregory Jbara, and Joanna Gleason, briefly leaving the role to play "Little Edie" in the original off-Broadway run of Grey Gardens (replaced by Erin Davie when the show moved to Broadway).

Gettelfinger is one of the singing trio Three Graces, which blends the musical styles of its three members' backgrounds: Broadway (Gettelfinger), Opera (Joy Kabanuck), and Pop (Kelly Levesque). Their first public performance was October 29, 2007, at the second annual Cole Porter-Like Salon, a Broadway Cares/Equity Fights AIDS benefit. In early 2008 the group toured the United States, Canada, and Mexico with Paul Potts, stopping in 20 cities. Three Graces released its debut album on March 4, 2008.

Gettelfinger played Morticia Addams in the first national tour of The Addams Family, which ran from September 2011 through December 2012.

Theatre credits

Broadway
 "Bird Girl", ensemble / u/s "Mayzie LaBird" in Seussical at Richard Rodgers Theatre (2000)
 "Ship's Passenger" in Anything Goes at Vivian Beaumont Theater (2000)
 "Courtesan" u/s "Luce" in The Boys from Syracuse at American Airlines Theatre (2002)
 "Maria"/  u/s "Carla," "Stephanie" in Nine at Eugene O'Neill Theatre (2003)
 "Carla" (Replaced Jane Krakowski) in Nine at Eugene O'Neill Theatre (2003)
 "Jolene" in Dirty Rotten Scoundrels at Imperial Theatre (2005–2006)
 "Cruella de Vil" in 101 Dalmatians Musical (2010–)

Off-Broadway
 "Liz" in Tenderloin for City Center Encores! (2000)
 Ensemble, "Bluebird Girl", "Carnival Person" in Carnival! for City Center Encores! (2002)
 "Edith ('Little Edie') Bouvier Beale" in Grey Gardens (World Premiere) at Playwrights Horizons (2006)

Regional
 "April"  in Company at Helen Hayes Theatre Company (Nyack, NY) (1999)
 "Fastrada" in Pippin at Paper Mill Playhouse (Milburn, NJ) (2000)
 "Aggie Ford" in Lone Star Love at Great Lakes Theater Festival, (Ohio Theater) (2001)
 "Bridget Allworthy" / "Lady Bellaston" in Tom Jones at North Shore Music Theatre (Beverly, MA) (2004)
 "Jolene" in Dirty Rotten Scoundrels at Old Globe Theatre (San Diego, CA) (2004)
 "Alexandra Spofford" in The Witches of Eastwick at Ogunquit Playhouse (2014)
 “Star” in The Cher Show (musical) at Ogunquit Playhouse (2022)

National tours
 Featured Performer in Fosse for First National Tour (1999–2000)
 Morticia Addams in The Addams Family (2011–2012)

Television
 Guiding Light
 "Erin" on Ed episode "Best Wishes" (aired January 30, 2004)
 "Debbie" on Without a Trace episode "The Line" (aired February 5, 2004)

Film
 "Flight Attendant" in Sex and the City (2008)

References

External links
Broadway.com profile.

Sara Gettelfinger - Myspace Music Page
Three Graces web site
Three Graces Fan Forum

American women singers
American musical theatre actresses
Actresses from Louisville, Kentucky
Musicians from Louisville, Kentucky
Singers from Kentucky
Kentucky women musicians
University of Cincinnati – College-Conservatory of Music alumni
DuPont Manual High School alumni
1970s births
Living people
Year of birth uncertain
21st-century American women